Martha Stewart Living is a magazine and former television program featuring entertaining and lifestyle expert Martha Stewart. Both the magazine and the television program focus on lifestyle content and the domestic arts.

Magazine
Martha Stewart Living began as a quarterly magazine in 1990, published by Time Inc. The magazine has been published monthly since mid-1994. Stewart took the magazine with her when she left Time Inc. in 1997, and Martha Stewart Living became the flagship brand of the Martha Stewart Living Omnimedia media empire. In 2015, Meredith Corporation assumed editorial and operational control of Martha Stewart Living and Martha Stewart Weddings.

Martha Stewart Living magazine features lifestyle content around food, home decorating, entertaining, crafts/DIY, travel, and tastemakers, with monthly columns including "From Martha", "Good Things", "Good Living", and "Everyday Food". Martha Stewart is the Founder and Chief Creative Officer of the magazine. The magazine's editorial staff is led by editor-in-chief, Elizabeth Graves, and includes a staff of industry-recognized editors including Sarah Carey, Editorial Director of Food & Entertaining, Melissa Milrad Goldstein, Beauty Director, and Melissa Ozawa, Features & Garden Editor.

During the period 2005–2013, Martha Stewart Living made a profit only in 2007.

Television program

The Martha Stewart Living television show debuted as a weekly half-hour syndicated program in September 1993. Intended to complement the magazine, the program featured Stewart as host of each episode where she presented segments on things such as cooking, gardening, craft making and decorating.  It expanded to weekdays in 1997, became a full hour-long program in 1999 (with a 30-minute weekend edition) and went on hiatus in autumn of 2004 following Stewart's stock trading case and conviction.

The show was distributed by Group W Productions from 1993–1995, Eyemark Entertainment from 1995–2000 following the CBS-Westinghouse merger, then King World Productions from 2000–2004 following CBS' merger with King World. It was succeeded by The Martha Stewart Show after Stewart's release from prison in 2005 and ran until it was cancelled in 2012.

Accolades
Both the magazine and the television show have won numerous awards.

References

External links 
 Magazine Official Site
 Television Program Official Site

1993 American television series debuts
2005 American television series endings
First-run syndicated television programs in the United States
Lifestyle magazines published in the United States
Magazines established in 1990
Magazines published in Iowa
Martha Stewart Living Omnimedia
Mass media in Des Moines, Iowa
Monthly magazines published in the United States
Quarterly magazines published in the United States
Television series by CBS Studios
Westinghouse Broadcasting
Women's magazines published in the United States
IAC (company)